BCCL may refer to:
 Bennett, Coleman and Co. Ltd. or The Times Group, a media company in India
 Bharat Coking Coal Limited, a subsidiary of Coal India Limited